Nephroma parile is a species of foliose lichen belonging to the family Peltigeraceae.

It has a cosmopolitan distribution.

References

Peltigerales
Lichen species
Lichens described in 1799
Taxa named by Erik Acharius